
John Amory Codman (1824-1886) was an artist in Boston, Massachusetts, in the 19th century. He was affiliated with the New England Art Union, and kept a studio in Amory Hall in the 1850s.

His wealth came from the Russian and China clipper trade. He married Martha Pickman Rogers (1829-1905) and their only surviving child was Martha Codman Karolik. She was a major benefactor to the arts.

Codman's will was the subject of several sensational court cases. He had left a substantial amount to his mistress, the widow Mrs. Eliza Ann Hales Kimball  Violet Kimball, but the bequest was challenged by his wife and daughter. The  decision on the first case allowed the bequest to stand but it was appealed and the will was overthrown. After further legal maneuvering, a settlement was reached. Mrs. Kimball received $15,000, rather than the $40,000 and additional considerations specified in the will.

References

Image gallery

External links

 WorldCat. Codman, John Amory 1824-1886

1824 births
1886 deaths
Artists from Boston
19th century in Boston
19th-century American painters
American male painters
19th-century American male artists